Cybelle Al Ghoul (born 20 October 1998) is a Lebanese footballer who plays as a winger for Lebanese club EFP.

Career statistics

International
Scores and results list Lebanon's goal tally first, score column indicates score after each Al Ghoul goal.

See also
 List of Lebanon women's international footballers

References

External links

 
 

1998 births
Living people
People from Matn District
Lebanese women's footballers
Women's association football wingers
Zouk Mosbeh SC footballers
Eleven Football Pro players
Lebanese Women's Football League players
Lebanon women's international footballers